The men's 800 metres at the 2018 Commonwealth Games, as part of the athletics programme, took place in the Carrara Stadium between 10 and 12 April 2018. The event was won by Wycliffe Kinyamal from Kenya as he finished ahead of the fast-finishing Kyle Langford who had come from sixth to second in the final straight.

Records
Prior to this competition, the existing world and Games records were as follows:

Schedule
The schedule was as follows:

All times are Australian Eastern Standard Time (UTC+10)

Results

First round
The first round consisted of three heats. The two fastest competitors per heat (plus two fastest losers) advanced to the final.

Heat 1

Heat 2

Heat 3

Final
The medals were determined in the final.

References

Men's 800 metres
2018